The Minister for Youth is the government minister in the New Zealand Government with responsibility for the rights and interests of young people.

The post was established by the Fourth Labour Government on 24 August 1987. It was split from the Social Welfare portfolio.

History 
The following ministers have held the office of Minister for Youth.

Key

Notes

References  

Lists of government ministers of New Zealand
Political office-holders in New Zealand